Twelve Red Herrings (or 12 Red Herrings) is a 1994 short story collection by British writer and politician Jeffrey Archer. Archer challenges his readers to find "twelve red herrings", one in each story. The book reached #3 in the Canadian best-sellers (fiction) list. J. K. Sweeney from Magill Book Reviews (01/01/1995) reviews the stories as "An attempt, it must be said, which is of such a nature that quite often the author succeeds in the effort."

For the story "One Man's Meat..." the reader is offered the choice of four different endings: "Rare", "Burnt", "Overdone" and "À Point". Sweeney from Magill Book Reviews comments on this: "Each of the conclusions is quite plausible, although the average reader may find one far more convincing that the others--a circumstance which the author no doubt anticipated with a certain degree of relish."

Contents
The book contains 12 stories.

"Trial and Error"
"Cheap at Half The Price"*
"Dougie Mortimer's Right Arm"*
"Do Not Pass Go"*
"Chunnel Vision"*
"Shoeshine Boy"*
"You'll Never Live to Regret It"*
"Never Stop on the Motorway"*
"Not for Sale"
"Timeo Danaos"*
"An Eye for an Eye"*
"One Man's Meat..."

In the preface the author notes that the stories indicated with an asterisk are "based on known incidents (some of them embellished with considerable licence)."

See also
Timeo Danaos et dona ferentes

References 
Archer, Jeffrey. Twelve Red Herrings, Harper Collins, 1994.

External links 
 

Short story collections by Jeffrey Archer
1994 short story collections
HarperCollins books